Berthold II may refer to:

 Berthold II, Duke of Carinthia ( – 1078)
 Berthold II, Duke of Swabia ( – 1111)
 Berthold II, Count of Andechs (before 1099 – 1151)